Augustine Volcano (Sugpiaq: Utakineq; Dena'ina: Chu Nula) is a lava dome volcano in Alaska consisting of a central complex of summit lava domes and flows surrounded by an apron of pyroclastic, lahar, avalanche, and ash deposits. The volcano is frequently active, with major eruptions recorded in 1883, 1935, 1963–64, 1976, 1986, and 2006. Minor eruptive events were reported in 1812, 1885, 1908, 1944, and 1971. The large eruptions are characterized by an explosive onset followed by the quieter effusion of lava. The irregular coastline of Augustine Island is due to the repeated catastrophic collapse of the summit dome, forming debris avalanches down the flanks and into Cook Inlet.

The island is mainly made up of past eruption deposits. Scientists have been able to discern that past dome collapse has resulted in large avalanches.

Description and geologic history

Augustine's summit consists of several overlapping lava dome complexes formed during many historic and prehistoric eruptions. Most of the fragmental debris exposed along its slopes  comprises angular blocks of dome-rock andesite, typically of cobble to boulder size but carrying clasts as large as 4 to 8 meters (10 to 25 feet), rarely as large as 30 meters (100 ft). The surface of such deposits is hummocky, a field of steep conical mounds and intervening depressions with many meters of local relief. En route to Katmai in 1913, Robert F. Griggs had briefly inferred landslide (debris avalanche) as the origin of Augustine's hummocky coastal topography about Burr Point, by geomorphic analogy with the hummocky and blocky deposit of a 1912 landslide near Katmai.

The hummocky deposits on Augustine's lower flanks resemble both topographically and lithologically those of the great landslide or debris avalanche that initiated the spectacular May 18, 1980, eruption of Mount St. Helens. The deposit of that landslide revealed the origin of coarse diamicts with hummocky topography at other strato volcanic cones. Since 1980 many hummocky coarsely fragmental deposits on Augustine's lower flanks have come to be interpreted as deposits of numerous great landslides and debris avalanches.

Eruptive activity 

January 22, 1976, and March 27, 1986, eruptions deposited ash over Anchorage and disrupted air traffic in southcentral Alaska.

On January 11, 1994, Augustine erupted at 13:44 and 14:13 UTC.

2005–2006 
The eruption consisted of four "phases", starting in April 2005 and continuing through March 2006. The precursory phase began as a slow, steady increase in microearthquake activity beneath the volcano on April 30, 2005. An earlier swarm in October 2004 developed seismicity rates that exceeded any observed since the 1986 eruption; however, the six-month-long period of quiescence between this swarm and April 30, 2005, makes any connection to the 2006 eruption uncertain. The number of located VT earthquakes slowly increased from an average of one to two per day in May 2005 to five to six per day in October 2005 to 15 per day in mid-December 2005. December 2 revealed the onset of a series of small phreatic explosions that were clearly recorded on the Augustine seismic network. The largest of these explosions occurred on December 10, 12, and 15. An observational overflight on December 12 revealed vigorous steaming from the summit area, a new vigorous fumarole on the summit's southern side at roughly  elevation, and a light dusting of ash on the volcano's southern flanks. A strong plume of steam and gas extended to the southeast. The ash was sampled on December 20 and was found to be a mix of weathered and glassy particles; the latter appear to be remobilized 1986 tephra. Between December 12, 2005, and January 10, 2006, seismicity rates were strongly elevated, with more than 420 earthquakes located by the AVO. Much of this activity occurred in spasmodic bursts similar to those observed before the 1986 eruption.

The volcano erupted on January 11, 2006, entering a second "stage", which would continue until January 28. Tectonic earthquakes began early in January, resulting in an explosive Volcanic Explosivity Index 3 eruption later in that day. Samples of the tephra were dense, insinuating that the lava released was mature.

Six explosions were recorded by seismic instruments between January 13, the first of these consuming a seismograph and a CPGS located on the northwestern flank. Ash columns now reached  and Kenai Peninsula residents reported ash deposits. On January 16, a new lava dome was observed on the summit; and the next day another explosive eruption sent ash  into the atmosphere. This explosion created a 20–30 meter wide crater in the new lava dome.

On September 22, 2007, the Alaska Volcano Observatory reported that shallow earthquake activity had increased over the week of September 22.  However, the activity was less than its level during the months leading up to the 2005–2006 eruption.

Sensor networks
The Plate Boundary Observatory has a network of 10 high-precision GPS instruments on the flanks of Augustine.  Subsequent volcanic activity claimed two of those sites.  The Alaska Volcano Observatory also operates a number of seismometers and tiltmeters all around the volcano, including four webcams.

See also
List of volcanoes in the United States

References

Notes

Further reading
Kienle, Jürgen, Zygmunt Kowalik, and T. S. Murty. "Tsunamis Generated by Eruptions from Mount St. Augustine Volcano, Alaska." Science 236, no. 4807 (1987): 1442–447. http://www.jstor.org/stable/1699705.

External links
 Augustine activity
 Augustine Volcano Live Webcam
 NASA Images from December 2005

1986 in Alaska
1994 in Alaska
2006 in Alaska
20th-century volcanic events
21st-century volcanic events
Active volcanoes
Complex volcanoes
Islands of Alaska
Mountains of Kenai Peninsula Borough, Alaska
Lava domes
Mountains of Alaska
Stratovolcanoes of the United States
Volcanoes of Alaska